Christos Giousis (born 8 February 1999) is a Greek professional footballer who plays as a right winger for Eerste Divisie club Telstar.

Career

AEK Athens
On 21 August 2017, Giousis signed a professional contract with AEK Athens. On 11 December 2017, he made his debut in the Super League in a 3–1 home win game against Kerkyra as a late substitute.

Loan to Platanias
On 31 January 2020, Giousis moved to Super League 2 club Platanias, as on loan.

Loan to Panachaiki
On 5 October 2020, Giousis moved to Super League 2 club Panachaiki, as on loan.

Telstar
On 26 August 2022, Giousis signed a two-year contract with Telstar in the Netherlands.

Career statistics

Honours
AEK Athens
 Super League: 2017–18

References

External links
 

1999 births
Footballers from Volos
Living people
Greek footballers
Greece under-21 international footballers
Greece youth international footballers
Association football wingers
AEK Athens F.C. players
Platanias F.C. players
Panachaiki F.C. players
AEK Athens F.C. B players
SC Telstar players
Super League Greece players
Super League Greece 2 players
Greek expatriate footballers
Expatriate footballers in the Netherlands
Greek expatriate sportspeople in the Netherlands